Live is an album of live recordings by Guano Apes. It was released in 2003.

Track listing

"Quietly" (3:40)
"No Speech" (3:46)
"Money & Milk" (2:38)
"Pretty in Scarlet" (3:56)
"We Use the Pain" (2:41)
"Living in a Lie" (4:17)
"Open Your Eyes" (2:54)
"Dick" (2:44)
"Sing That Song" (3:18)
"Mine All Mine" (5:18)
"Sugar Skin" (3:59)
"Move a Little Closer" (3:19)
"You Can't Stop Me" (3:35)
"Scratch the Pitch" (3:30)
"Big in Japan" (3:27)
"Dödel Up" (7:40)
"Wash It Down" (3:44)
"Diokhan" (4:35)
"Gogan" (2:41)
"Lords of the Boards" (5:27)

Limited edition
A limited edition version of the album was also released with an additional 20 tracks contained on a bonus 80 minute DVD.

DVD chapter listing
"Quietly"  (3:33)
"No Speech" (3:43)
"Money & Milk" (2:36)
"Pretty in Scarlet" (3:49)
"We Use the Pain" (2:37)
"Living in a Lie" (4:19)
"Open Your Eyes" (2:50)
"Dick" (3:33)
"Sing That Song" (3:08)
"Mine All Mine" (5:13)
"Sugar Skin" (3:58)
"Move a Little Closer" (3:18)
"You Can't Stop Me" (3:33)
"Scratch the Pitch" (3:27)
"Big in Japan"  (2:58)
"Trompeter" (2:36)
"Dödel Up" (7:34)
"Diokhan" (4:32)
"Kumba Yo!" (3:36)
"Lords of the Boards" (5:55)

References
 

Guano Apes albums
2003 live albums
GUN Records live albums